Scipio Township is one of twenty townships in Allen County, Indiana, United States. As of the 2010 census, its population was 414.

Geography

Major highways

Cemeteries
The township contains one cemetery, Scipio.

References

Citations

Sources
 United States Census Bureau cartographic boundary files
 U.S. Board on Geographic Names

Townships in Allen County, Indiana
Fort Wayne, IN Metropolitan Statistical Area
Townships in Indiana